The Student Loans Company (SLC) is an executive non-departmental public body company in the United Kingdom that provides student loans. It is owned by the UK Government's Department for Education (85%), the Scottish Government (5%), the Welsh Government (5%) and the Northern Ireland Executive (5%). The SLC is funded entirely by the UK government and the devolved administrations. It is responsible for both providing loans to students, and collecting loan repayments alongside HM Revenue and Customs (HMRC). The SLC's head office is in Glasgow, with other offices in Darlington and Llandudno.

Peter Lauener has been the organisation's non-executive chair since April 2020. Chris Larmer was appointed CEO in October 2022, prior to this he was the Executive Director of Operations.

History 
The SLC was established in 1989 to provide loans and grants to students studying in the UK. From 1990 to 1998 these were mortgage-style loans, which were aimed at helping students with the cost of living and repaid directly to the SLC. From 1998, with the introduction of tuition fees in the UK, the SLC instead began providing loans under an income-contingent repayment (ICR) scheme. From 2006, loans covered the cost of tuition fees in addition to living costs. Repayments for these loans are collected by HMRC via the PAYE tax system. The ICR loan scheme was replaced with a new ICR scheme in 2012 to include a longer repayment period following an increase in tuition fees.

Student loan book sales 
In the late 1990s, the government sold two tranches of the mortgage-style loans to investors. Firstly in 1998 to Greenwich NatWest raising £1bn, and secondly in 1999 to Deutsche Bank and the Nationwide Building Society, also raising £1bn. The SLC's remaining mortgage-style loans, for which payments were mostly in arrears, were sold to a consortium, Erudio Student Loans, in 2013 for £160m.

In 2014, the government indicated that it would start selling the SLC's £12bn book of 1998 - 2012 ICR loans to improve the UK public finances.

The first ICR debt sale was completed in December 2017 with English loans which entered repayment between 2002 and 2006 (inclusive). The debt sale was completed with the loans being sold to Income Contingent Student Loans 1 (2002-2006) Plc; a group of silent investors.

The SLC will remain responsible for the day-to-day administration of all duties related to the repayment of these loans, and repayments will be paid on to the Investors.

As was true in the previous debt sales, the same is true for this first ICR debt sale in that the new debt owner(s) are unable to change any aspect of the terms and conditions that applied when a borrower entered into their contract to receive (and repay) their student loans.

Controversies
In January 2011, executive Ed Lester was given a two-year contract as the head of the Student Loans Company, for which he was paid through his personal services company without deduction of income tax and national insurance contributions. Following criticism and parliamentary debate, these arrangements were changed in February 2012 and Mr Lester was then paid through the SLC payroll. A review of the tax arrangements for public sector appointees was undertaken by the Treasury as a consequence of this issue.

In July 2014, the SLC was accused of using controversial tactics akin to those of the payday loans company Wonga after it was discovered that it had been sending out letters from what appeared to be an independent debt collection agency called Smith Lawson & Company. (In June 2014, Wonga had been ordered to pay £2.6 million in compensation for sending customers letters from fictitious debt recovery firms.). The SLC announced it was suspending the use of the letters, which it said had used the "secondary brand" (which small print at the bottom of the letters indicated was a trading name of the Student Loans Company) to avoid paying fees to a conventional debt collection agency.

References

External links 
 
 Contact Student Finance England – GOV.UK (SFE is part of SLC)

British companies established in 1989
Government agencies established in 1989
Department for Education
Government-owned companies of the United Kingdom
Education finance in the United Kingdom
Students in the United Kingdom
Organisations based in Glasgow